Gabriella Gáspár (born 19 May 1979, in Veszprém) is a Hungarian former handballer.

Achievements

Nemzeti Bajnokság I:
Winner: 1999, 2001, 2003, 2004
Silver Medallist: 2000, 2002, 2005
Bronze Medallist: 2006, 2007
Magyar Kupa:
Winner: 1999, 2000, 2002, 2004
Finalist: 2005
EHF Champions League:
Winner: 1999
Semifinalist: 2004, 2005
EHF Cup:
Finalist: 2003
Semifinalist: 2008
EHF Champions Trophy:
Winner: 1999

References

External links
 Gabriella Gáspár Player Profile on Dunaújvárosi NKS Official Website
 Gabriella Gáspár career statistics on Worldhandball.com

1979 births
Living people
People from Veszprém
Hungarian female handball players
Sportspeople from Veszprém County